The Ocilla Star is a newspaper based out of Ocilla, Georgia. It is regarded as the main newspaper of Irwin County. It is printed weekly.

External links
 http://www.theocillastar.com

Irwin County, Georgia
Newspapers published in Georgia (U.S. state)
Weekly newspapers published in the United States
Publications established in 1903